Gruffydd ap Gwenwynwyn (died c. 1286) was a Welsh king who was lord of the part of Powys known as Powys Wenwynwyn and sided with Edward I in his conquest of Wales of 1277 to 1283.

Gruffydd was the son of Gwenwynwyn and Margaret Corbet. He was still a child when his father, who had been driven out of his princedom by Llywelyn the Great, died in exile in 1216. He spent his youth in England, maintained by the king, and did not return to Wales until after Llywelyn's death. When Dafydd ap Llywelyn was forced to come to terms with King Henry III of England in 1241, Gruffydd was given most of the lands formerly held by his father, paying homage to Henry for them. Around this time he married Hawise, daughter of John Lestrange of Knockin.

When Llywelyn ap Gruffudd increased his power in Wales after 1255, Gruffydd continued to support the crown, and in 1257 he was again driven into exile. In 1263 he agreed to transfer his allegiance to Llywelyn under threat of being stripped of his lands, and this was confirmed at the Treaty of Montgomery in 1267. In 1274 Gruffydd, his wife Hawise and his son Owain were all involved with Llywelyn's brother Dafydd ap Gruffydd in a plot to assassinate Llywelyn. Dafydd was with Llywelyn at the time, and it was arranged that Owain would come with armed men on 2 February to carry out the assassination; however he was prevented by a snowstorm. Llywelyn did not discover the full details of the plot until later that year, when Owain confessed to the Bishop of Bangor. He said that the intention had been to make Dafydd Prince of Gwynedd, and that Dafydd would then reward Gruffydd with lands. When Llywelyn discovered the details of the plot he sent envoys to Welshpool to summon Gruffydd to appear before him, but Gruffydd fled to England. He settled in Shrewsbury and used it as a base for raids on Llywelyn's lands, probably encouraged by the king. After the war of 1277, when Llywelyn was forced to cede his lands outside Gwynedd, Gruffydd was again given his lands back. He became embroiled in an increasingly bitter dispute with Llywelyn over lands in Arwystli. Llywelyn wanted the issue resolved by Welsh law while Gruffydd wanted English law used and was supported by King Edward I of England.

Gruffydd supported King Edward in the final war of 1282 although by now he was an old man. There have been suggestions that his eldest son Owain may have been involved in the killing of Llywelyn at Cilmeri in December that year. 

At the end of the Welsh War of 1282–1283 the principality of Powys Wenwynwyn was abolished and the family – now Marcher Lords – adopted the surname de la Pole meaning "of Poole" referring to their family seat in Poole (modern Welshpool). For his loyalty to Edward I, the king permitted Baron de la Pole to begin building (or re-building) Powis Castle. After 1283 his estate became increasingly controlled by his son Owain and he died some time between February 1286 and the end of 1287.

Owain divided the lands he inherited with his brothers, by arrangements later recorded in detail in the Calendar of Patent Rolls for 1342, pages 496–7.

He was buried in the Black Friars Priory in Shrewsbury.

References 
 Dictionary of Welsh Biography
Kari Maund (2006) The Welsh kings: warriors, warlords and princes (Tempus) 
David Stephenson, Medieval Powys: Kingdom, Principality and Lordships 1132–1293 (Bodell and Brewer, 2016).

1280s deaths
Year of birth unknown
Year of death uncertain

Monarchs of Powys
13th-century Welsh monarchs
Welsh princes
House of Mathrafal
Burials in Shropshire